Iain John Grant Napier (born 10 April 1949) is a Scottish businessman, who was non-executive chairman of Imperial Tobacco, a British multinational tobacco company, from 2007 to 2013. Napier was also non-executive chairman of John Menzies plc until May 2016 and chairman of McBride plc until 30 Jun 2016. He is a director of Molson Coors since July 2008. He is a director of William Grant & Sons since 2009.

He is from Rothesay, Bute.

Career
Napier was group chief executive officer of Taylor Wimpey plc (formerly Taylor Woodrow plc) from 2001 to 2006.

References

Living people
British accountants
1949 births
Place of birth missing (living people)
British chairpersons of corporations
People from Rothesay, Bute
Scottish accountants